This is a list of newspapers in Georgia, US.

List of newspapers
{| class="wikitable sortable"
|-
! Title
! Locale
! Year est.
! Frequency
! Publisher/parent company
! Notes
|-
| Advance
| Vidalia
| 
| 
| 
| 
|-
| Albany Herald
| Albany
| 
| Sunday - Friday
| Southern Community Newspapers, Inc. (SCNI)
| Newspaper in Albany, Georgia, United States, and serves as the county's official legal organ.
|-
| 'Alma Times|Alma
|
|Weekly
|
|
|-
| Athens Banner-Herald|Athens
| 
| Daily
|Morris Communications Company
| 
|-
| Americus Times-Recorder| Americus
| 
| Daily
| 
| 
|-
| Atkinson County Citizen|Atkinson
|
|Weekly
|
|
|-
| Atlanta Daily World| Atlanta
| 
| Weekly
| 
| 
|-
| Atlanta Inquirer|Atlanta
|
|Weekly
|
|
|-
| Atlanta Journal-Constitution| Atlanta
| 1868
| Daily
| 
| Began as Constitution in 1868; merged with Journal in 2001 to form Journal-Constitution|-
| Atlanta Voice|Atlanta
|1966
|Weekly
|
|
|-
| Augusta Chronicle| Augusta
| 1785
| Daily
| Morris Communications Company
| Began as Augusta Gazette in 1785
|-
| Barnesville Herald-Gazette|Barnesville
|1867
|Weekly
|
|
|-
| Berrien Press|Nashville
|
|Weekly
|
|
|-
| Blackshear Times| Blackshear
| 
| Weekly
| 
| 
|-
| Brunswick News| Brunswick
| 
| Daily
| 
| 
|-
| Bryan County News|Fitzgerald
|
|Weekly
|
|
|-
| Cairo Messenger| Cairo
| 
| 
| 
| 
|-
| Calhoun Times|Calhoun
|1870
|Weekly
|Times-Journal Inc
|
|-
| Camilla Enterprise| Camilla
| 
| 
| 
| 
|-
| Catoosa County News|Ringgold
|
|Weekly
|
|
|-
| Champion Newspaper|Decatur
|
|Weekly
|
|
|-
| Charlton County Herald|Folkston
|
|Weekly
|
|
|-
| Cherokee Tribune & Ledger|Canton
|
|Daily
|
|
|-
| Citizen|Fayetteville
|
|Weekly
|
|-
| Clayton News| Jonesboro
| 1950
|  Wednesday
| Times-Journal Inc
| Published once a week newspaper in Clayton County, Georgia, United States, and serves as the county's official legal organ.
|-
| Clayton Tribune| Clayton, Georgia
| 
| Weekly
| 
| 
|-
| Clinch County News|Homerville
|
|Weekly
|
|
|-
| Coastal Courier|Hinesville, Georgia
|
|Weekly
|
|
|-
| Cochran Journal|Cochran
|
|Weekly
|
|
|-
| Colonnade| Georgia College & State University, Milledgeville
| 
| Weekly
| 
| 
|-
| Cordele Dispatch| Cordele
| 
| Tuesdays-Fridays & Sundays
| 
| 
|-
| Courier Herald|Dublin
|1876
|Weekly
|
|
|-
| Covington News| Covington
| 
| Wednesday, Friday & Sunday
| 
| 
|-
| Creative Loafing| Atlanta
| 
| Weekly
| 
| 
|-
| The Crossroads Chronicle|Swainsboro
| 
| Wednesday
| 
| 
|-
| CrossRoadsNews| South DeKalb/East Metro Atlanta
| 
| Weekly
| 
| 
|-
| Daily Citizen| Dalton
| 
| Daily
| Community Newspaper Holdings, Inc.
| 
|-
| Daily Tribune News|Cartersville
|
|Daily
|
|
|-
| Dawson County News|Dawsonville
|
|Weekly
|
|
|-
| Dodge County News|Eastman
|
|Weekly
|
|
|-
| Donalsonville News| Donalsonville
| 
| 
| 
| 
|-
| Douglas Enterprise|Douglas
|
|Weekly
|
|
|-
| Dunwoody Crier|Alpharetta
|
|Weekly
|Appen Media Group                          
|
|-
| Early County News| Blakely
| 
| 
| 
| 
|-
| Effingham Herald|Rincon
|
|Weekly
|
|
|-
| Elberton Star|Elberton
|
|Weekly
|
|
|-
| Fannin Sentinel| Blue Ridge
| 
| Weekly
| 
| 
|-
| Forest-Blade|Swainsboro
|
|Weekly
|
|
|-
| Forsyth County News|
|
|Wed/Fri/Sun
|
|
|-
| Franklin County Citizen-Leader|Lavonia
|
|Weekly
|
|
|-
| Fulton County Daily Report| Atlanta
| | 
| 
| 
| 
|-
|George-Anne| Georgia Southern University, Statesboro
|
|Weekly
|
|
|-
| Georgia Fire News| Georgia
| 
| 
| 
| 
|-
| Georgia Post|Roberta
|
|Weekly
|
|
|-
| Gwinnett Daily Post| Lawrenceville
| 
| Wednesday, Friday & Sunday
| Times-Journal Inc
| Newspaper in Lawrenceville, Georgia, United States, and serves as the county's official legal organ.
|-
| Hartwell Sun| Hartwell
| 
| 
| 
| 
|-
| Henry Herald| McDonough
| 1847
|  Wednesday, Saturday/Sunday
| Times-Journal Inc
| Henry County’s News Source Since 1874. Published twice weekly newspaper in McDonough, Georgia, United States, and serves as the county's official legal organ.
|-
| Herald-Leader|Fitzgerald
|
|Weekly
|
|
|-
| Houston Home Journal|Perry
|
|Weekly
|
|
|-
| Jackson Herald|Jefferson
|
|Weekly
|MainStreet Newspapers Inc.
|
|-
| Jackson Progress-Argus|Jackson
|
|Wednesday
|Times-Journal Inc
|Newspaper in Jonesboro, Georgia, United States, and serves as the county's official legal organ.
|-
| Jeff Davis Ledger|Hazlehurst
|
|Weekly
|
|
|-
| Jones County News|Gray
|1895
|Weekly
|
|
|-
| LaGrange Daily News| LaGrange
| 
| 
| 
| 
|-
| Lake Oconee Breeze|Milledgeville
|
|Weekly
|
|
|-
| Lanier County News|Lakeland
|
|Weekly
|
|
|-
| Lee County Ledger| Leesburg
| 1978
| Weekly
|
|
|-
| Ledger-Enquirer| Columbus
| 1828
| Daily
| McClatchy Company
| Began as Columbus Enquirer in 1828, became daily Ledger-Enquirer in 1988
|-
| Marietta Daily Journal| Marietta
| 
| 
| 
| 
|-
| Miller County Liberal| Colquitt
| 
| 
| 
| 
|-
| Morgan County Citizen| Madison
| 
| 
| 
| 
|-
| Metter Advertiser|Metter
|
|Weekly
|
|
|-
| Monticello News|Monticello
|
|Weekly
|
|
|-
| Moultrie Observer| Moultrie
| 
| 
| Community Newspaper Holdings, Inc.
| 
|-
| Newnan Times-Herald| Newnan
| 
| 
| 
| 
|-
| News-Observer|Blue Ridge
|
|Weekly
|
|
|-
| News-Reporter|Washington
|
|Weekly
|Wilkes Publishing Co., Inc.
|Merger of The Washington News and The Washington Reporter
|-
| Northeast Georgian|Cornelia
|
|Weekly
|Community Newspapers Inc.
|
|-
| Ocilla Star| Ocilla
| 
| 
| 
| 
|-
| Pelham Journal| Pelham
| 
| 
| 
| 
|-
| Post-Searchlight | Bainbridge
| 
| 
| 
| 
|-
| Quitman Free Press|Quitman
|
|Weekly
|
|
|-
| Red and Black| University of Georgia, Athens
| 
| Weekly
| 
| 
|-
| Rockdale-Newton Citizen| Conyers
| 
| Wednesday & Sunday
| Times-Journal Inc
| Newspaper in Conyers, Georgia, United States, and serves as Rockdale county's official legal organ.
|-
| Rockdale News| Conyers
| 
| Saturday
| 
| 
|-
| Rome News-Tribune| Rome
| 
| Daily
| 
| 
|-
| Savannah Morning News| Savannah
| 1850
| Daily
| Morris Communications Company
| 
|-
| Statesboro Herald| Statesboro
| 
| Daily
| 
| 
|-
| Sylvester Local News| Sylvester
| 1884
| Weekly
|
|
|-
| Technique| Georgia Tech, Atlanta
| 
| Weekly
| 
| 
|-
| Telegraph| Macon
| 
| Daily
| McClatchy Company
| 
|-
| Thomasville Times-Enterprise| Thomasville
| 
| Daily
| Community Newspaper Holdings, Inc.
| 
|-
| Tifton Gazette| Tifton
| 
| Mondays, Wednesdays & Fridays
| Community Newspaper Holdings, Inc.
| 
|-
| Times-Courier|Ellijay
|1875
|Weekly
|Times-Courier Publishing Co.
|
|-
| Times-Georgian|Carrollton
|
|Daily
|
|
|-
| Toccoa Record| Toccoa
| 1873
| Weekly
| Community Newspaper Holdings, Inc.
| 
|-
| Tribune and Georgian|St. Marys
|
|Weekly
|
|
|-
| True Citizen|Waynesboro
|
|Weekly
|
|
|-
| Union Recorder| Milledgeville
| 
| Daily
| Community Newspaper Holdings, Inc.
| 
|-
| Valdosta Daily Times| Valdosta
| 
| Daily
| Community Newspaper Holdings, Inc.
| 
|-
| Waycross Journal Herald| Waycross
| 
| Daily
| 
| 
|-
| Wheeler County Eagle| Alamo
| 
| 
| 
| 
|-
| Wiregrass Farmer| Ashburn
| 
| 
| 
| 
|-
| Today News Africa| Georgia
| 2014
| Daily
|TNA, LLC

|  African-American online and Newspaper
|}

18th century
Newspapers published in 18th-century Augusta, Georgia

 Augusta Herald. W., July 17, 1799-Dec. 31, 1800+
 Georgia. The Augusta Chronicle And Gazette Of The State. W., Apr. 11, 1789-Dec. 27, 1800+
 The Georgia State Gazette, Or, Independent Register. W., Sept. 30, 1786-Apr. 11, 1789.
 Southern Centinel And Gazette Of The State. W., Dec. 5, 1793-Nov. 7, 1799.

Newspapers published in 18th-century Savannah, Georgia

 Columbian Museum & Savannah Advertiser. S.W., Mar. 4, 1796-Dec. 29, 1800+
 The Gazette Of The State Of Georgia. W., Jan. 30, 1783-Oct. 16, 1788.
 The Georgia Gazette. W., Apr. 7, 1763-Feb. 7, 1776.
 Georgia Gazette. W., Oct. 23, 1788-Dec. 25, 1800+
 The Royal Georgia Gazette''. W., Jan. 21, 1779-June 6, 1782.

Defunct

See also
 Georgia media
 List of radio stations in Georgia (U.S. state)
 List of television stations in Georgia (U.S. state)
 Media of cities in Georgia: Athens, Atlanta, Augusta, Columbus, Macon, Savannah
 Journalism:
 :Category:Journalists from Georgia (U.S. state)
 University of Georgia Henry W. Grady College of Journalism and Mass Communication, in Athens
 Literature of Georgia (U.S. state)

References

Bibliography
  (+ List of titles 50+ years old)
 
 
 
 
 
  (Includes information about weekly rural newspapers in Georgia)
 
 
 

External links

  (Digitized issues of historical newspapers)
  (Subject guide)
 . (Includes "Editors & Owners," "Writers & Cartoonists")
 . (Survey of local news existence and ownership in 21st century)
  (Directory ceased in 2017)
 
 
  (Includes Georgia newspapers)
 
 
 
 
 
 

 
Georgia
Newspapers
Georgia
Newspapers
Georgia
Georgia